Tommy Thompson is an American politician who served as a member of the Arkansas House of Representatives for the 65th district from 2013 to 2015. Thompson first represented the 60th district from January 2011 until January 14, 2013.

Education
Thompson earned his Bachelor of Science degree in agriculture and a Master of Science in adult education from the University of Arkansas.

Elections
2014: Thompson was unseated in his bid for a third term in the November 4 general election by the Republican Rick Beck, an electrical engineer from Conway County. The district also includes Perry County.
2012: Redistricted to the 65th district, and with incumbent Tracy Pennartz running for Arkansas Senate, Thompson was unopposed in the May 22, 2012 Democratic primary. He won the November 6, 2012 general election with 5,858 votes (57.0%) against Republican nominee Jeff Croswell.
2010: When 60th district Representative Johnny Hoyt ran for the Arkansas Senate and left the seat open, Thompson won the May 18, 2010 Democratic primary with 2,921 votes (66.5%), and won the November 2, 2010 general election with 4,438 votes (54.4%) against Republican nominee Brent Murphy.

References

External links
Official page at the Arkansas House of Representatives
Tommy Thompson at Ballotpedia
Tommy Thompson at OpenSecrets

Place of birth missing (living people)
Year of birth missing (living people)
Living people
Democratic Party members of the Arkansas House of Representatives
Politicians from Hot Springs, Arkansas
University of Arkansas alumni